Gorrie Elementary School (1889), originally the Hyde Park School, is a historic building in Tampa, Florida. It was renamed in 1915 to honor John Gorrie. It is a two story brick building the St. Petersburg Times called a "jewel". Singer and actress Mary Hatcher attended the school.

References

Elementary schools in Florida
Schools in Tampa, Florida
1889 establishments in Florida
School buildings completed in 1889
Educational institutions established in 1889